Charles B. Joiner Jr. (born October 14, 1947) is an American former professional football player who was a wide receiver in the American Football League (AFL) and National Football League (NFL) for 18 seasons. He played 11 seasons with the San Diego Chargers, with whom he earned all three of his Pro Bowl selections, and was named first-team All-Pro in 1980. He was inducted into the Pro Football Hall of Fame in 1996.

Joiner played college football with the Grambling State Tigers and was a three-time, first-team all-conference selection in the Southwestern Athletic Conference (SWAC). He was selected in the fourth round of the 1969 NFL/AFL draft by the AFL's Houston Oilers. Joiner played four seasons each for the Oilers and Cincinnati Bengals before joining the Chargers. He retired with the most career receptions, receiving yards, and games played of any wide receiver in NFL history.

Early life and college
Joiner was born in Many, Louisiana, the only child in a low income family. His father, Charlie Sr., was a truck driver. Joiner attended W. O. Boston High School in Lake Charles, Louisiana. He did not play football until his junior year, but excelled as an all-state receiver and earned a scholarship to Grambling State University to play for coach Eddie Robinson. At Grambling, Joiner played with quarterback James Harris and was a three-time, first-team All-SWAC selection (1966–1968). He was the team's leading receiver from 1966 to 1968 with 2,066 yards.

Professional playing career
Joiner graduated from Grambling in 1969 and was selected in the fourth round of the 1969 NFL/AFL Draft with the 93rd overall pick by the AFL's Houston Oilers. He started his career as a defensive back, but he made the switch to wide receiver in his rookie year after being carted off the field from a hit by Denver Broncos running back Floyd Little. Joiner played for Houston until 1972, when he was traded to the Cincinnati Bengals. He had his best season to date in 1975, when he had career bests of 37 receptions for 726 yards, an average of 19.6 yards per catch. On November 23, 1975, he set a Bengals' then-single-game record with 200 receiving yards in a 35–23 loss to Cleveland. After the season, Cincinnati traded him to the San Diego Chargers for defensive end Coy Bacon. Joiner was happy to reunite with new Chargers offensive coordinator Bill Walsh, who had been his coach in Cincinnati.

Joiner had 50 receptions for 1,056 yards, averaging 21.1 yards per reception in 1976, when he was named second-team All-Pro by the Newspaper Enterprise Association (NEA).  The trade for Joiner was the rare swap that benefited both teams, as both he and Bacon were named to the Pro Bowl that year. In 1977, Joiner was often double covered, as newly acquired receiver Johnny Rodgers was injured, and their No. 1 draft pick from the year before, Joe Washington, was recovering from knee issues. Joiner had just 35 catches, which still led all Chargers wide receivers. Ray Perkins became the Chargers' offensive coordinator in 1978, their third offensive coordinator in three years. He emphasized running back Lydell Mitchell as a possession receiver and rookie No. 1 pick John Jefferson as the deep threat. He phased out Joiner, who finished with 33 receptions. Don Coryell had become San Diego's head coach in 1978, replacing Tommy Prothro midseason. 

The Chargers bolstered their receiving corps, using their first-round draft pick to select Kellen Winslow in 1979. Coryell also hired Joe Gibbs as the new offensive coordinator that season. They noticed that Joiner had been getting open the year before, and envisioned him as a key to their offense. It was with the Chargers' high-flying "Air Coryell" offense that Joiner had his most productive years, exceeding 1,000 yards receiving in a season three times and being selected for the Pro Bowl twice.  Although he never played in a Super Bowl, Joiner, quarterback Dan Fouts, tight end Winslow, and fellow receivers Jefferson and later Wes Chandler helped the Chargers reach consecutive American Football Conference (AFC) championship games in the 1980 and 1981 seasons. In 1979, Joiner helped San Diego earn their first divisional title in 14 years with a 17–7 win over Denver in the regular-season finale. He was forced back to the locker room twice during the game with injuries, but returned to the field bandaged both times. It was an inspirational performance with Jefferson unable to play and John Floyd, the Chargers only other receiver, being just a rookie. He finished second in the AFC in receptions to Baltimore's Joe Washington, his former Chargers teammate, with a career-high 72 catches for 1,008 yards and four touchdowns. At 32 years old, Joiner was the third player in NFL history to catch 70 or more passes after age 30, joining Don Maynard and Ahmad Rashad, who were each 30. He was named to the Pro Bowl, replacing an injured Lynn Swann, who himself was a replacement for Steve Largent. Joiner was the oldest player in the all-star game.

The following season in 1980, Joiner had 71 receptions for 1,132 yards, and teamed with Jefferson and Winslow to become the first trio of receivers on a team to reach 1,000 yards in the same season. The three were all named first-team All-Pro by the Associated Press. In the 1980 AFC championship game, Joiner led the team with six catches for 130 yards and two touchdowns. He had a career-high 1,188 yards receiving in 1981, when the Chargers won their third consecutive AFC West title. In the divisional playoffs, he played a key role in San Diego's 41–38 overtime win over the Miami Dolphins, a game that became known as The Epic In Miami. Joiner caught 7 passes for 108 yards, including a 39-yard reception on the penultimate play of the game set up Rolf Benirschke's game-winning 29-yard field goal. The Chargers advanced again to the conference championship, but lost to Joiner's former team Cincinnati. Joiner passed Charley Taylor as the career leader in receptions on November 25, 1984, breaking the mark of 649 with six catches for 70 yards in a 52–24 loss against the Pittsburgh Steelers. He also surpassed Maynard's all-time record of 11,834 receiving yards in Week 5 of 1986 against Seattle. Joiner finished the year with 34 catches, his least productive season since 1978, and retired from playing after the season.

Joiner was the last active player from the AFL. He finished his 18 AFL/NFL seasons with 750 receptions for 12,146 yards, averaging 16.2 average per catch, and 65 touchdowns. He caught 586 passes in 11 seasons with San Diego after totaling 164 in seven seasons with Houston and Cincinnati. Joiner had 50 or more catches in seven seasons, five with 60 or more, and three with at least 70 with the Chargers. He retired as the then-NFL leader in career receptions and receiving yards. At the time, he also played the most seasons (18) and games by a wide receiver (239). At age 39, Joiner also retired as the oldest wide receiver in NFL history,  broken by Jerry Rice. Joiner had 530 receptions after he was 30 years old, including 396 after turning 33. He credited his success and longevity to Coryell: "Thanks to Coach Coryell’s offense and his revolutionary passing game, he prolonged my career, from the day I got to the Chargers until the day I retired. I will forever be grateful to him and what he did for the game of football."

Legacy
Joiner excelled despite neither being among the quickest nor most talented receivers in the NFL. Throughout his career, he was overshadowed by more glamorous receiving mates, including Jerry LeVias and Ken Burrough in Houston, Isaac Curtis in Cincinnati, and Jefferson, Chandler, and Winslow with San Diego. In addition to good health and longevity, Joiner was an intelligent player and precise pass route runner. Hall of Fame coach Bill Walsh called Joiner "the most intelligent, the smartest, the most calculating receiver the game has ever known." Gibbs, his offensive coordinator in San Diego, praised Joiner as "a totally dedicated guy who was just a great producer". "Without guestion, he is the finest technician—running routes and reading coverages—in the National Football League", said Ernie Zampese, the Chargers' receiving coach. He was Fouts' favorite receiver on third down. "All I’m trying to do out there is look for a port in a storm. He’s the port. Having Charlie is like having a fail-safe button," said Fouts.

Joiner was inducted into the Louisiana Sports Hall of Fame in 1990. He was voted into the Pro Football Hall of Fame in 1996, becoming the third Grambling player to be selected. In 1999, he was ranked No. 100 on The Sporting News list of the 100 greatest football players. He was inducted into the Black College Football Hall of Fame in 2013.

Coaching career
In 1987, Chargers head coach Al Saunders hired Joiner as an assistant coach. He was later an assistant for the Buffalo Bills and Kansas City Chiefs. Joiner returned to San Diego as receivers coach from 2008 to 2012 before retiring after 44 years as a player and coach in football.

See also
List of National Football League career receiving yards leaders

References

External links
 
 

 

1947 births
Living people
African-American coaches of American football
African-American players of American football
American Conference Pro Bowl players
American Football League players
American football wide receivers
Cincinnati Bengals players
Grambling State Tigers football players
Houston Oilers players
Kansas City Chiefs coaches
People from Many, Louisiana
Players of American football from Louisiana
Pro Football Hall of Fame inductees
San Diego Chargers coaches
San Diego Chargers players
21st-century African-American people
20th-century African-American sportspeople
10,000 receiving yards club